1982 Football Championship of Ukrainian SSR was the 52nd season of association football competition of the Ukrainian SSR, which was part of the Soviet Second League in Zone 6. The season started on 4 April 1982. Administratively, the Ukrainian Zone was moved again this time from Zone 5 to Zone 6.

The 1982 Football Championship of Ukrainian SSR was won by Bukovyna Chernivtsi. Qualified for the interzonal playoffs, the team from Chernivtsi Oblast did not manage to gain promotion by placing last in its group.

The "Ruby Cup" of Molod Ukrayiny newspaper (for the most scored goals) was received by Bukovyna Chernivtsi.

Teams

Location map

Promoted teams
Mayak Kharkiv – Champion of the Fitness clubs competitions (KFK) (debut)

Relegated teams
Prykarpattia Ivano-Frankivsk – (Returning after 2 seasons)

Withdrawn teams
SKA Lviv was merged with Karpaty Lviv and replaced the latter as SKA Karpaty Lviv in the Soviet Pervaya Liga (1982).

Renamed teams
 Shakhtar Horlivka was called Vuhlyk Horlivka
 Zakarpattia Uzhhorod was called Hoverla Uzhhorod
 Stakhanovets Stakhanov was called Shakhtar Stakhanov
 Prykarpattia Ivano-Frankivsk was called Spartak Ivano-Frankivsk

Final standings

Top goalscorers
The following were the top ten goalscorers.

See also
 Soviet Second League

Notes

External links
 1982 Soviet Second League, Zone 6 (Ukrainian SSR football championship). Luhansk football portal
 1982 Soviet championships (all leagues) at helmsoccer.narod.ru

1982
3
Soviet
Soviet
football
Football Championship of the Ukrainian SSR